Valik Chal (also Romanized as Valīk Chāl) is a village in Banaft Rural District, Dodangeh District, Sari County, Mazandaran Province, Iran. At the 2006 census, its population was 67, in 15 families. Valik Chal has views of Alborz Mountain Range and nearby forests. Due to its high altitude (Height above mean sea level: approximately 1500 meters≈5000 feet), Valik Chal experiences relatively cool summers. Winters can be cold and snowy with much rain. Valik Chal has been named after 'Valik', the local word for the fruit 'elderberry', which naturally grows in this village, and 'Chal' the local word for 'valley'. 
The people of Valik Chal are mainly farmers and ranchers raising crops and cattle.

Gallery

References 

Populated places in Sari County